Haplochromis degeni is a species of cichlid endemic to Lake Victoria. It is sometimes placed in the monotypic genus Platytaeniodus, but FishBase leaves it in Haplochromis pending a thorough review of that group.  This species grows to a length of  SL. The specific name honours the Swiss naturalist Edward Degen (1852-1922) who collected fishes, including the type of this species.

References

degeni
Taxa named by George Albert Boulenger
Fish described in 1906
Taxonomy articles created by Polbot